Villa Verde, Bàini in sardinian language, is a comune (municipality) in the Province of Oristano in the Italian region Sardinia, located about  northwest of Cagliari and about  southeast of Oristano.

Villa Verde borders the following municipalities: Ales, Palmas Arborea, Pau, Usellus, Villaurbana.

References

Cities and towns in Sardinia